No Sense of Sin is the debut studio album of English band the Lotus Eaters. It was released in 1984 by record label Arista. It contains their popular single, "The First Picture of You", released the previous year.

Release 

No Sense of Sin reached number 96 in the UK Albums Chart.

The album was re-issued in 2001 by Vinyl Japan and again in 2010 by Cherry Red Records.

Reception 

Michael Sutton, writing for Trouser Press, called it "one of the most underrated albums of the '80s" and "a truly special record". The same reviewer also called it "a gorgeously crafted collection of melancholic guitar pop" writing for AllMusic.

Track listing

Personnel 

 The Lotus Eaters

 Gerrard Quinn – performer, production
 Jeremy Kelly – performer, production
 Peter Coyle – performer, production

 Technical personnel

 Bob Sargeant – production (tracks A3, A6, B1, B2, B4 and B6) 
 Dale Griffin – production (track B5) 
 Nigel Gray – production (track B3)

References

External links 

 

1984 debut albums
Albums produced by Nigel Gray
Albums produced by Bob Sargeant
Arista Records albums
New wave albums by English artists
Jangle pop albums